Gerhard Zotter (born 24 April 1941) is an Austrian judoka who competed in the 1964 Summer Olympics.

In 1964 he was eliminated in the quarter-finals of the lightweight competition after losing his fight to the upcoming silver medalist Eric Hänni.

References

1941 births
Living people
Austrian male judoka
Olympic judoka of Austria
Judoka at the 1964 Summer Olympics
20th-century Austrian people